Farrago is the student publication for the University of Melbourne in Melbourne, Australia published by the University of Melbourne Student Union. It is the oldest student publication in Australia. It was first published on 3 April 1925.

Name 
The term "farrago", means a confused variety of miscellaneous things. It has been used by Edward Tylor in his book Primitive Culture. The name is included in the motto (drawn originally from the Satires of Juvenal) Quidquid agunt homines nostri farrago libelli est – "whatever men do forms the motley subject of our page" which was written on the first issue of the famous eighteenth-century periodical Tatler.

History 
The publication was founded in 1925 by Randal Heymanson, who was the first editor, and Brian Fitzpatrick, who was the first chief of staff.

For a number of years, Farrago was published in a newspaper or broadsheet format. In the 2000s, Farrago switched to a magazine format, which it continues to use today.

Organisation 
Up to four editors are elected annually and hold the shared title of Media Officer at the University of Melbourne Student Union, with the union secretary being the legally defined publisher. The editorship has been highly politicised in the past, and election campaigns are vigorous.

Archives of Farrago are available at the Student Union's Rowden White Library and the University of Melbourne's Baillieu Library.

Noteworthy past editors include Cyril Pearl, Geoffrey Blainey, Amirah Gust, Claude Forrell, Ian Robinson, Morag Fraser, Henry Rosenbloom, Garrie Hutchinson, Ross McPherson, Colin Golvan, Lindsay Tanner, Peter Russo, Louise Carbines, Jim Brumby, Pete Steedman, Arnold Zable, Kate Legge, Nicola Gobbo, Cathy Bale, Christos Tsiolkas, and Nam Le.

Voluntary student unionism 

The implementation of voluntary student unionism in 2006 had a significant impact on the viability of student publications across Australia, as compulsory student union membership fees had been the major source of income for most. "Christos Tsiolkas was editor in 1987, and he had a budget of $280,000; we have a budget of $58,000, and $55,000 of that will go on printing. We're quite lucky, we're a well-funded institution, and the University has provided transitional funding", said Farrago editor for 2009.

Aims and content 

Farrago is a magazine whose content is produced and edited entirely by students, which aims to be a voice, creative outlet and source of information for those who attend the University of Melbourne – irrespective of age, course and interests. Farrago encourages contributions from students in both written and/or visual forms, because without these it would not be an accurate representation of students at the university.

Farrago contains the following sections: News, Non-Fiction, Creative. It previously contained a Science section, which was discontinued in recent years. Farrago also features regular columns from several student writers.

Current and past editors

The Fitzpatrick Awards 
Every year, the Media Office holds the Fitzpatrick Awards ceremony to celebrate and acknowledge the publication's contributors and volunteers. The first annual Fitzpatrick Awards were held in 2009 at Dante's Emporium and Cafe in Fitzroy. The ceremony is named after the publication's first chief of staff, Brian Fitzpatrick.

Related projects 
In addition to editing Farrago, the University of Melbourne Student Union Media Officers oversee several related projects.

Above Water 
Above Water is an annual creative writing anthology published in collaboration with the University of Melbourne Student Union's Creative Arts department. It publishes a variety of creative forms including fiction, poetry and creative non-fiction. The first edition was published in 2005.

Unlike Farrago, the contents of Above Water is selected via competition, with prizes for the winning entries.

In 2017, the publication received almost 300 submissions, of which 17 were selected for publication.

Radio Fodder 
Radio Fodder is the University of Melbourne Student Union's student radio station, produced by the student union Media Officers. The name originated from a discontinued section of Farrago titled "The Fodder".

Farrago Student Union Election Guide 
According to the University of Melbourne Student Union's constitution, each year the Media Office is required to print a student union election guide containing the names and statements of all candidates in the student union elections.

In most previous years, the election guide has been included as a section in an edition of Farrago, sometimes appearing as a perforated, removable booklet. In 2017, the editors opted to print the guide as a separate booklet entirely, which was then slipped into editions of Farrago on stands around the University of Melbourne campus.

Controversy 
Despite the magazine's commitment to providing a voice to a diverse range of contributors regardless of political persuasion, the editorial partisanship of the publication has varied under different editors. Zoe Efron, one of Farrago's 2014 editors, noted that the front cover of a 1974 edition of Farrago consisted of an ad for the then-Labor Prime Minister Gough Whitlam. She also noted that overt partisanship was still visible more recently, with a late 2013 edition of Farrago featuring a cover illustration of Tony Abbott with the caption "WE'RE FUCKED".

In 1992 Pennsylvania State University student James Panichi labelled Farrago as "leftist crap ... the product of politically opinionated hippies" in an article for The Daily Collegian.

References 

Student newspapers published in Australia
Magazines established in 1925
University of Melbourne
1925 establishments in Australia